TransCanada or variation,  may refer to:

 Trans Canada Trail, a hiking trail system
 Trans-Canada Highway, primary highway that runs across Canada
 Trans-Canada Air Lines, predecessor to Air Canada
 TC Energy, formerly TransCanada Corporation, an energy company based in Calgary, Alberta
 TransCanada Tower, Calgary, an office tower located in Calgary, Alberta
 TransCanada pipeline, an petro-energy pipeline maintained by TransCanada Pipelines
 Trans-Canada Trophy, CASI award for outstanding achievement in aerospace

See also

 Canada (disambiguation)
 Trans (disambiguation)